Charles Wentworth-FitzWilliam may refer to:
Charles Wentworth-Fitzwilliam, 5th Earl Fitzwilliam (1786–1857)
Charles Wentworth-FitzWilliam (MP) (1826–1894), MP, son of the above
Sir Charles Wentworth-FitzWilliam (equerry) (1848–1925), grandson of fifth Earl, Crown Equerry to King George V

See also
Charles Fitzwilliam (disambiguation)